The Lowndes County Freedom Organization (LCFO), also known as the Lowndes County Freedom Party (LCFP) or Black Panther party, was an American political party founded during 1965 in Lowndes County, Alabama. The independent third party was formed by local African-American citizens led by John Hulett, and by staff members of the Student Nonviolent Coordinating Committee (SNCC) under the leadership of Stokely Carmichael.

Founding and history

On March 23, 1965, as the march from Selma to Montgomery took place, Carmichael and some in SNCC who were participants declined to continue marching after reaching Lowndes County and decided to instead stop and talk with local residents. After word spread that Carmichael avoided arrest from two officers who ordered him to leave a school where he was registering voters after he challenged them to do so, Carmichael and the other SNCC activists who stayed with him in the county were inspired to create the LCFO with Hulett (who, since the banning of the NAACP in the state, had been active in Fred Shuttlesworth's Alabama Christian Movement for Human Rights), and other local leaders.

As the Voting Rights Act of 1965 allowed African Americans to register to vote, the objective of the party was to register African Americans in a county that was 80% black. Hulett, who was LCFO's chairperson, was one of the first two African American voters whose registration was successfully processed in Lowndes County. Local residents and SNCC staff members decided to avoid joining the Alabama Democratic party because the state party was led by segregationist Governor George Wallace and employed the slogan "White Supremacy" represented by an image of a white rooster.  Due to high rates of illiteracy among the black residents, an image of a black panther was adopted to identify party members of LCFO in contrast to members of the all-white Democratic party represented by a white rooster.  The idea for the logo came from SNCC field secretary Ruth Howard.

Legacy

The LCFO's symbol of a black panther was later adopted by the Black Panther Party founded by Bobby Seale and Huey P. Newton and other organizations throughout the United States.

In 1970, the LCFO merged with the Alabama Democratic Party. This resulted in former LCFO candidates winning public offices. Among them was Hulett, who was elected Sheriff of Lowndes County. Hulett served in this position for 22 years before serving three terms as a probate judge.

The work of the political organization was examined in the documentary film Eyes on the Prize within the episode "The Time Has Come (1964–66)".

See also

 Civil Rights Movement
 Black Panther Party

References

Citations

Bibliography

Further reading

External links
 Lowndes County Freedom Party (LCFP) - Provided by the SNCC Digital Gateway
 Lowndes County Freedom Organization - Provided by the Encyclopedia of Alabama
 Origin of the Black Panther Party logo - Part of the H.K. Yuen Social Movement Archive, 1963-1982 within the Comparative Ethnic Studies Collection located at the University of California, Berkeley

1965 establishments in Alabama
African-American history of Alabama
Black political parties in the United States
Civil rights movement
History of African-American civil rights
History of voting rights in the United States
Political parties in Alabama